Hibbertia nemorosa is a species of flowering plant in the family Dilleniaceae and is endemic to north Queensland. It is a shrub with ridged branches, oblong leaves and yellow flowers arranged singly or in pairs in leaf axils with 40 to 48 stamens and up to eight staminodes arranged around two or three carpels.

Description
Hibbertia nemorosa is a shrub with spreading, woody, ridged branches, and hairy foliage. Flowering occurs from January to August.

Taxonomy
This hibbertia was first formally described in 2010 by Hellmut R. Toelken, and given the name Hibbertia heterotricha in the Journal of the Adelaide Botanic Gardens from specimens collected in 1962 in the Mount Spec Range near Paluma by Clifford Gittins, in 1962. Later in 2010, in a subsequent edition of the Journal of the Adelaide Botanic Gardens, Toelken changed the name to Hibbertia nemorosa because the name H. heterotricha was already in use for a different taxon (H. heterotricha Bureaeu ex Guillamin). The specific epithet (nemorosa) means "growing in woods", referring to the habitat of this species.

Distribution and habitat
This hibbertia grows in wet forest in the Paluma and Mount Spec ranges and on Hinchinbrook Island in north Queensland.

Conservation status
Hibbertia nemorosa is classified as of "least concern" under the Queensland Government Nature Conservation Act 1992.

See also
List of Hibbertia species

References

nemorosa
Flora of Queensland
Plants described in 2010
Taxa named by Hellmut R. Toelken